Bhargavi Thankappan (born 1942) is an Indian politician of the Communist Party of India. She was the deputy speaker of the 8th Kerala Legislative Assembly.

Early life
Bhargavi was born on 24 July 1942 in Adoor to K. Easwaran and his wife K. Kutty. She received her Master of Arts degree in commerce from Sree Narayana College, Kollam.

Career
Bhargavi took up a job at the Rubber Board for a brief period in 1968, before working for the Kerala State Electricity Board until 1971. She entered the Kerala Legislative Assembly for the first time from Neduvathoor constituency as a candidate of the Communist Party of India (CPI). Later, she won the 1971 Indian general election from Adoor seat reserved for scheduled castes. She represented Kilimanoor in the 6th, 7th, 8th and 10th Kerala Legislative Assembly. She was the deputy speaker for the 8th assembly from 1987 to 1991. She is also a member of the state and national council of CPI.

The CPI expelled Bhargavi in 2002, after the Justice Mohan Kumar Commission found that she had taken bribe from a liquor contractor for smooth running of his business without government intervention. Five years later, a Vigilance Special Court acquitted her for lack of evidence.

Personal life
Bhargavi married A. K. Thankappan on 29 June 1967. Together they have one son and two daughters.

References

1942 births
Living people
India MPs 1971–1977
Women members of the Lok Sabha
Lok Sabha members from Kerala
Kerala MLAs 1970–1977
Communist Party of India politicians from Kerala
Female politicians of the Communist Party of India
Kerala MLAs 1977–1979
Kerala MLAs 1982–1987
Kerala MLAs 1987–1991
Kerala MLAs 1991–1996
20th-century Indian women
20th-century Indian people
Deputy Speakers of the Kerala Legislative Assembly
Women members of the Kerala Legislative Assembly